Russell Mills (1892-1959) was an American architect based in Reno, Nevada.  A number of his works are listed on the U.S. National Register of Historic Places.
He "spent early years" in the Philippines.
He worked as a draftsman for noted architect Frederic DeLongchamps.

He opened his own practice in about 1936.

He was one of the first members of the Nevada State Board of Architecture.
Works include:
Jobs Peak Ranch, 144 Summit Ridge Way, Genoa, Nevada (Mills, Russell), NRHP-listed.  Perhaps Mills' first commission, in Swiss chalet style.
J. Clarence Kind House, 751 Marsh Ave., Reno, Nevada (Mills, Russell), NRHP-listed
Veteran's Elementary Memorial School (1949), 1200 Locust St., Reno, Nevada (Mills, Russell), NRHP-listed Moderne
Vocational-Agriculture Building, 1170 Elmhurst St., Lovelock, Nevada (Mills, Russell), NRHP-listed
Palmer Engineering Building, at University of Nevada, Reno

References

External links
	Architectural drawings for proposed addition to UNR Engineering Building, NAA7. Special Collections, University Libraries, University of Nevada, Reno. design by Russell Mills

Architects from Nevada
People from Reno, Nevada
1892 births
1959 deaths
20th-century American architects